Langballig is an Amt ("collective municipality") in the district of Schleswig-Flensburg, in Schleswig-Holstein, Germany. The seat of the Amt is in Langballig.

The Amt Langballig consists of the following municipalities:

Dollerup 
Grundhof 
Langballig
Munkbrarup
Ringsberg 
Wees
Westerholz

Ämter in Schleswig-Holstein